is the 24th single by Japanese idol duo Wink. Written by Neko Oikawa, Sergio Portaluri, David Sion, and Fulvio Zafret, it is a Japanese-language cover of the 1988 song "Jive Into the Night" by the Italian Eurobeat group The Green Olives. The "Hyper Euro Mix" version was released as a single on June 25, 1995, by Polystar Records.

Background and release 
Prior to Wink's version, "Jive Into the Night" was covered in Japanese by the White Tigers in 1988 (as ) and by Masaru Narita & D.K.I. in 1989, each with different lyrics and arrangement. "Jive Into the Night (Yaban na Yoru ni)" was remixed by MST, which consisted of producers Mitsugu Matsumoto, Takahiro Tashiro, and Osamu Marumoto.

"Jive Into the Night (Yaban na Yoru ni) [Hyper Euro Mix]" peaked at No. 92 on the Oricon's weekly charts and sold over 6,000 copies, making it the duo's lowest-charting and lowest-selling single.

Track listing

Chart positions 
Weekly charts

Year-end charts

References

External links 
 
 

1995 singles
1995 songs
Wink (duo) songs
Japanese-language songs
Songs with lyrics by Neko Oikawa